Cheaper by the Dozen is a 2003 American family comedy film directed by Shawn Levy. It is a remake of the 1950 film of the same name. Both films were inspired by the semi-autobiographical book Cheaper by the Dozen by Frank Bunker Gilbreth Jr. and his sister Ernestine Gilbreth Carey. The 2003 version stars Steve Martin, Bonnie Hunt, Hilary Duff, Tom Welling, and Piper Perabo. This film and its sequel have little connection with the original source material.

The film was released on December 25, 2003, by 20th Century Fox and grossed $190 million worldwide against a $40 million budget. The Rotten Tomatoes critical consensus criticized the film for its lack of humor.

A sequel, Cheaper by the Dozen 2, was released in 2005. Another remake was released in 2022 on Disney+.

Plot

Tom Baker is a football coach at a small rural college in Midland, Indiana, where he raised twelve children, and his wife, Kate, has written her story in a book and hopes to send it to her friend to publish the book. One day, Tom unexpectedly receives an offer from his old friend and football teammate Shake McGuire to coach at his alma mater in his hometown of Evanston, Illinois. Tom accepts the offer, and demands all the children vote on moving. Despite losing the vote, Tom has the entire family return to Evanston for a better home and space. The atmosphere at the Bakers' new house is tense and the situation at school is even worse.

When her book is ready to pick up for publication, Kate is required to do a national book tour to promote it. Tom thinks that he can handle everything in the family's household while Kate is away, so he decides to hire the family's oldest child, Nora, and her self-absorbed boyfriend, Hank, to manage the children. When Nora and Hank arrive, the children plan to make Hank the target of their prank by soaking his underwear in meat and assisting the Bakers' pet dog, Gunner, to attack him by biting his buttocks, prompting him to refuse to assist in babysitting. As a result, Nora drives off with Hank, while Tom lectures them for their prank. After Kate departs for her book tour, Tom realizes that he cannot handle the children on his own after a chaotic night. In reply to this revelation, Tom tries to hire a housekeeper, but nobody is willing to work with a family as large as the Bakers, so Tom decides to bring the football players from work into the family's house for game practicing in the living room to prepare for the Saturday night football game as the children perform chores and their household games. However, the children start causing trouble at school and Charlie, the Bakers' oldest son, is removed from the football team. Kate overhears from the children about the chaos and cancels the book tour to take charge of the situation. Kate's publisher decides to create an additional promotion for her book by inviting Oprah Winfrey to tape a segment about the Bakers in their home instead.

Despite much coaching from Kate, the Bakers are not able to demonstrate the loving, strongly bonded family that Kate described in her book. When Mark becomes upset that his pet frog has died, a heated fight erupts moments before the segment starts, leading the cameramen to call Winfrey to cancel it. Mark runs away from home, prompting the Bakers to find him. Tom indulges a hunch that Mark is trying to run back to the Bakers' old home, and eventually finds Mark on an Amtrak train departing from Chicago to Midland. Reuniting with the rest of their family, the Bakers begin to address their issues with each other, and Tom ultimately resigns from his position at his alma mater with Shake.

Cast

Bakers
 Steve Martin as Tom Baker, the patriarch of the Baker family
 Bonnie Hunt as Kate Baker, the matriarch of the Baker family and the narrator of the film
 Piper Perabo as Nora Baker, the eldest Baker child
 Tom Welling as Charlie Baker, the second Baker child
 Hilary Duff as Lorraine Baker, the third Baker child
 Kevin G. Schmidt as Henry Baker, the fourth Baker child
 Alyson Stoner as Sarah Baker, the fifth Baker child
 Jacob Smith as Jake Baker, the sixth Baker child
 Forrest Landis as Mark Baker, the seventh Baker child whom the other children claimed to have been delivered by FedEx.
 Liliana Mumy and Morgan York as Jessica and Kim Baker, the eighth and ninth Baker children and fraternal twin girls
 Blake Woodruff as Mike Baker, the tenth Baker child
 Brent and Shane Kinsman as Kyle and Nigel Baker, the youngest Baker children and identical twin boys

Others
 Paula Marshall and Alan Ruck as Tina and Bill Shenk, the Baker family's new neighbors
 Steven Anthony Lawrence as Dylan Shenk, Tina and Bill's son who befriends the younger Baker children
 Richard Jenkins as Shake McGuire, Tom's colleague and friend
 Vanessa Bell Calloway as Diana Phillips, Kate's agent
 Ashton Kutcher as Hank (uncredited), Nora's child-hating and lazy boyfriend
 Tiffany Dupont as Beth, Charlie's girlfriend
 Cody Linley as Quinn
 Joel McCrary as Gil
 Dax Shepard as Camera Crew Member
 Regis Philbin as himself
 Kelly Ripa as herself
 Amy Hill as Miss Hozzie, Kyle and Nigel's kindergarten teacher

The film's director Shawn Levy makes a cameo as a reporter. Jared Padalecki has an uncredited cameo as an unnamed bully that causes problems for Charlie. Wayne Knight has an uncredited cameo as Pete, the electrician whose repairs on the family's chandelier cause him to fall off of his ladder in two different incidents.

Soundtrack

Other compositions used in the movie are "Classical Gas" by Mason Williams and Carl Orff's "O Fortuna", among others.

Reception

Critical response
On Rotten Tomatoes the film has a 24% rating based on reviews from 119 critics and an average score of 4.58/10. The site's consensus reads: "In this family of twelve children, much chaos ensues, but little hilarity." On Metacritic, the film received a weighted average score of 46 out of 100 based on 30 reviews, indicating "mixed or average reviews". Audiences polled by CinemaScore gave the film an A− grade.

Despite this, the film was given "Two Thumbs Up" from Roger Ebert and Richard Roeper on their television show. Ebert in his review for the Chicago Sun-Times gave the film 3 out of 4 stars and called it "lighthearted fun".

Robert Koehler of Variety was critical of the uneven tone of the film, varying between "schmaltzy/gooey and slapstick/gross-out" and wrote that it was "as far from the original pic and its autobiographical memoir source as it can be while retaining the same title" but predicted a wide ranging audience for the film.

Box office
The film ranked at #2 for the weekend, grossing $27,557,647 in its opening weekend ($35,397,241 including its Thursday Christmas Day gross of $7,839,594) from 3,298 theaters for an average of $8,356 per theater ($10,733 average per theater over four days), being kept from the top spot by The Lord of the Rings: The Return of the King. The film went on to gross $138,614,544 in North America, and an additional $51,597,569 internationally, for a total gross of $190,212,113 worldwide, nearly five times its $40 million budget.

Accolades
Ashton Kutcher was nominated for a Golden Raspberry Award for Worst Actor for his performance in this, Just Married and My Boss's Daughter but lost to Ben Affleck with Daredevil, Gigli and Paycheck.

Home media
The film was released on VHS and DVD on April 6, 2004.

References

External links

  
 
 
 Movie stills

2003 films
2000s children's comedy films
20th Century Fox films
Remakes of American films
2000s English-language films
Films about families
Films directed by Shawn Levy
Films produced by Michael Barnathan
Films scored by Christophe Beck
Films set in Illinois
Films with screenplays by Craig Titley
Films with screenplays by Alec Sokolow
Films with screenplays by Joel Cohen
American children's comedy films
2003 comedy films
Films about siblings
Films about parenting
2000s American films